McNichols is a surname. Notable people with the surname include:

Jeremy McNichols (born 1995), American football player
John J. McNichols (1927–2020), American politician and lawyer
Raymond Clyne McNichols (1914–1985), United States federal judge
Robert James McNichols (1922–1993), United States federal judge
Stephen L.R. McNichols (1914–1997), Colorado's 35th Governor from 1957 to 1963
William Hart McNichols (born 1949), American Roman Catholic priest and artist

See also
McNichols Sports Arena ("Big Mac"), indoor arena in Denver, Colorado, USA